Kukulcania geophila is a species of crevice weaver in the family of spiders known as Filistatidae. It is found in the United States and Mexico.

Subspecies
These two subspecies belong to the species Kukulcania geophila:
 Kukulcania geophila geophila (Chamberlin & Ivie, 1935) i g
 Kukulcania geophila wawona (Chamberlin & Ivie, 1942) i c g
Data sources: i = ITIS, c = Catalogue of Life, g = GBIF, b = Bugguide.net

References

External links

 

Filistatidae
Articles created by Qbugbot
Spiders described in 1935